Account Rendered may refer to:

 Account Rendered (1932 film), a British crime film
 Account Rendered (1957 film), a British murder mystery
 Account Rendered, a 1911 novel by E. F. Benson
 Account Rendered (novel), a 1928 novel by Rosita Forbes